Cerradomys langguthi is a species of rodent from South America in the genus Cerradomys. It occurs only in northeastern Brazil and was formerly included in C. subflavus.

References

Percequillo, A.R., E. Hingst-Zaher, and C.R. Bonvicino. 2008. Systematic review of genus Cerradomys Weksler, Percequillo and Voss, 2006 (Rodentia: Cricetidae: Sigmodontinae: Oryzomyini), with description of two new species from Eastern Brazil. American Museum Novitates 3622: 1–46.

Mammals of Brazil
Cerradomys
Mammals described in 2008
Taxa named by Alexandre Reis Percequillo